Argynnis pandora, the cardinal, is a butterfly of the family Nymphalidae. It is common throughout southern Europe and is also found in northern Africa and the Middle east and then east across the Palearctic to northwestern India.

Description in Seitz
The wingspan is 64–80 mm. A. pandora Schiff. (= cinara F., maja Cr.) (71c). The largest European Argynnis. Above strongly
recalling valesina, but brighter greenish, densely spotted with black. Beneath quite different, the apex of the forewing and the hindwing bright green, the disc of the forewing fleshy red and spotted with deep black, the hindwing with a few narrow bands, which are more white than silvery and vary strongly in number and development.

Biology
The butterfly flies from April to September (in Europe typically May to August) depending on the location. In Switzerland, the species is found at altitudes of up to 2600 meters. Among other habitats, it favours deciduous and open pine forests, in which there is a large supply of nectar-rich plants from the genera Cirsium , Carduus or Centaurea.

The larvae feed on Viola species.

References

External links
Matt Rowling's European Butterflies
Guy Padfield's European Butterfly Page

Argynnis
Butterflies of Europe
Butterflies described in 1775